The Stenian Period (from , meaning "narrow") is the final geologic period in the Mesoproterozoic Era and lasted from  Mya to  Mya (million years ago). Instead of being based on stratigraphy, these dates are defined chronometrically. The name derives from narrow polymetamorphic belts formed over this period.

Preceded by the Ectasian Period and followed by the Neoproterozoic Era.

The supercontinent Rodinia assembled during the Stenian. It would last into the Tonian Period.

This period includes the formation of the Keweenawan Rift at about 1100 Mya.

Fossils of the oldest known sexually reproducing organism, Bangiomorpha pubescens, first appeared in the Stenian.

See also

Notes

References 

Geological periods
Proterozoic geochronology